Oulad Nacer is a town and rural commune in Fquih Ben Salah Province, Béni Mellal-Khénifra, Morocco. At the time of the 2004 census, the commune had a total population of 26,527 people living in 3918 households.

References

Populated places in Fquih Ben Salah Province
Rural communes of Béni Mellal-Khénifra